The field of electrical and electronics engineering has grown to include many related disciplines and occupations.

The Dictionary of Occupational Titles lists a number of occupations in electrical/electronics engineering. It describes them as concerned with applications of the laws of electrical energy and the principles of engineering for the generation, transmission and use of electricity, as well as the design and development of machinery and equipment for the production and utilization of electrical power:

 electrical engineer
 electrical test engineer
 electrical design engineer
 electrical-prospecting engineer (alternate title: electrical engineer, geophysical prospecting)
 electrical-research engineer
 electronics engineer
 electronics-design engineer
 electronics-research engineer
 electronics-test engineer
 illuminating engineer
 planning engineer, central office facilities (tel. & tel.)
 supervisor, drafting and printed circuit design
 sales-engineer, electrical products
 sales-engineer, electronics products and systems
 electrical technician (alternate title: electrical-laboratory technician)
 electronics technician
 technician, semiconductor development
 cableengineer, outside plant (telephone and telecommunications)
 distribution-field engineer (utilities) (alternate title: line inspector)
 electrical engineer, power system (utilities) (alternate title: power engineer)
 electrolysis-and-corrosion-control engineer (alternate titles: corrosion-control specialist; corrosion engineer; electrolysis engineer; electrolysis investigator)
 engineer of system development (utilities) (alternate titles: development-and-planning engineer; planning engineer; system-planning engineer)
 engineer-in-charge, studio operations (radio-TV broad.) (alternate titles: chief engineer; chief engineer, broadcasting operations; transmission engineer)
 engineer-in-charge, transmitter (radio-TV broad.) (alternate titles: director of engineering; engineer, chief; transmitter engineer)
 induction-coordination power engineer (utilities)
 outside-plant engineer (tel. & tel.)
 power-distribution engineer (utilities) (alternate title: electric-distribution engineer)
 power-transmission engineer (utilities) (alternate titles: electrical-transmission engineer; transmission-and-coordination engineer; transmission-line engineer)
 protection engineer (utilities)
 supervisor, microwave (radio-TV broad.)
 transmission-and-protection engineer (tel. & tel.) (alternate title: transmission engineer)
 engineering manager, electronics
 central-office equipment engineer (tel. & tel.)
 commercial engineer (radio-TV broad.) (alternate title: traffic engineer)
 customer-equipment engineer (tel. & tel.) (alternate title: services engineer)
 instrumentation technician
 controls designer (alternate title: controls project engineer)
 integrated circuit layout designer (alternate title: mask designer)
 printed circuit designer
 drafter, electrical
 drafter, electronic (alternate title: drafter, electromechanical)
 design technician, computer-aided (electron. comp.) alternate title: digitizer)

The Institute of Electrical and Electronics Engineers (IEEE) has developed  specialized groups ("societies") which professionals can join according to their specialization:

 aerospace and electronic systems
 antennas and propagation
 broadcast technology
 circuits and systems
 communications
 components, packaging, and manufacturing technology
 computational intelligence
 computers
 consumer electronics
 control systems
 dielectrics and electrical insulation
 electron devices
 electromagnetic compatibility
 engineering in medicine and biology
 geoscience and remote sensing
 industrial electronics
 industry applications
 information theory
 instrumentation and measurement
 intelligent transportation systems
 magnetics
 microwave theory and techniques
 nuclear and plasma sciences
 oceanic engineering
 photonics
 power electronics
 power and energy
 product safety engineering
 reliability
 robotics and automation
 signal processing
 solid-state circuits
 systems, man, and cybernetics
 ultrasonics, ferroelectrics, and frequency control
 vehicular technology

References

Electrical